I Never Promised You a Rose Garden is an Academy Award-nominated, 1977 American fantasy drama film based on Joanne Greenberg's 1964 novel of the same name.

Plot
Pretty and privileged Deborah is, at the age of 16, a borderline schizophrenic who spends most of her waking hours in a bizarre fantasy realm. After a suicide attempt, she lands in a mental institution, where the hostile environment threatens to destabilize her condition even further. It's only through the focused attention of the sympathetic Dr. Fried that Deborah is gradually able to distinguish between dreams and reality again.

Cast

 Kathleen Quinlan as Deborah Blake
 Bibi Andersson as Dr. Fried
 Ben Piazza as Jay Blake
 Lorraine Gary as Esther Blake
 Martine Bartlett as Secret Wife
 Margo Ann Berdeshevsky as Drawing Patient
 Darlene Craviotto as Carla
 Reni Santoni as Hobbs
 Susan Tyrrell as Lee
 Signe Hasso as Helene
 Diane Varsi as Sylvia
 Norman Alden as McPherson
 Sylvia Sidney as Miss Coral
 Dennis Quaid as Shark, Baseball Pitcher
 Clint Howard as Baseball Catcher
 Karin de la Penha as Nurse
 Robert Viharo as Anterrabae
 Jeff Conaway as Lactamaeon
 Carol Worthington as patient with cerebral palsy ("spastic patient")

Production
A screen adaptation of the book had been in development off and on since 1967, with Natalie Wood, Liza Minnelli, Mia Farrow and Charlotte Rampling all set to star at various times.

In the wake of the success of One Flew Over the Cuckoo's Nest, Roger Corman was able to get funding for a movie version of Rose Garden. Bibi Andersson played Dr. Fried, while Kathleen Quinlan played Deborah. All references to Judaism were removed, including the storyline of the vicious cruelty Deborah suffered from anti-Semitic peers, so that her childhood bout with urethral cancer becomes the sole reason for Deborah's "retreat from reality".

In an interview, Greenberg stated that the references to Judaism were removed because the producers were "terrified." The author added that the characterizations of mental illness in the film "stank on ice."

Deborah's name is changed from Blau (which means "blue" in German, and parallels the author's pseudonym "Green") to Blake. Another major theme of the book, Deborah's artistic talent which flourished in spite of her illness, was reduced to a scene in which she scribbles childishly on a drawing pad. The Kingdom Of Yr is portrayed on-screen, as are some of its gods, but never seen in its original ethereal beauty, only the wasteland that it became much later.

The background music for the Yr sequences is a recording of a Balinese Kecak, the ceremonial chant of the sacred monkeys from the Ramayana.

In a 2006 interview, Greenberg recalled that she was not consulted on any aspect of the film, and was contacted only by Bibi Andersson. She recalled Andersson telling her that the producers had said Greenberg could not be consulted as she was "hopelessly insane".

The studio is listed as "Imorh" Productions, imorh (variously meaning "sleep", "death" or "insanity") being an Yri word from the novel.

The movie was one of the most expensive ever made from New World Pictures.

Reception

On review aggregator Rotten Tomatoes, 40% of 5 reviews are positive, and the average rating is 6.8/10.

Roger Ebert gave the film three stars out of four and wrote, "This is difficult material to bring to life, but a young actress named Kathleen Quinlan does it with heart and sensitivity. There were opportunities here for climbing the walls and chewing the scenery, I suppose, but her performance always finds the correct and convincing human note. And it's the skill with which Miss Quinlan (and Bibi Andersson) follow that thread of characterization that makes the movie work. Otherwise, those desert fantasies and all those feathers and fur might have been fatally distracting." 

Vincent Canby of The New York Times stated, "How Deborah, with the help of one remarkable doctor, is eventually able to recognize her own pain and thus come to some kind of terms with her demons is the moving substance of this film that leaves one almost as exhausted as the heroine." He also praised Kathleen Quinlan for "a remarkably fine, contained performance as Deborah. There are no mannerisms, no tricks, only a sense of panic barely contained, of intelligence and feeling struggling to break free." 

Gene Siskel of the Chicago Tribune gave the film two-and-a-half stars out of four and wrote that Kathleen Quinlan was "smashing" in her first major role, but the plot "spends a lot of time—too much time—telling us about the troubled world of mental hospitals," and the fantasy sequences "run on too long and look phony." 

Variety said in a negative review, "Good intentions resolve into high-minded tedium and pic's sensationalistic aspects come off as confusing or repulsive, sometimes both." Charles Champlin of the Los Angeles Times called it "a thrilling account of the struggle to save an attractive young girl from her self-destructive delusions," with Quinlan giving "a spectacular performance." 

Gary Arnold of The Washington Post wrote, "Unfortunately, the movie places a premium on shock effects and mawkish reassurances at the price of the authenticity and hard-earned inspirational resolution that distinguished the novel ... When the movie Deborah recovers, it seems an inexplicable and even ludicrous miracle, a happy ending for slipshod filmmakers." 

Geoff Brown of The Monthly Film Bulletin called it "simplistic and sentimental ... It is largely left to the cast, particularly the excellent Kathleen Quinlan, to invest the proceedings with any emotional truth."

I Never Promised you a Rose Garden was nominated for an Academy Award for Best Adapted Screenplay at the 50th Academy Awards. The film received two Golden Globe nominations for Best Picture and Best Actress for Kathleen Quinlann.

References

External links
 
 

1977 films
1977 drama films
1970s English-language films
1970s fantasy drama films
American fantasy drama films
Films about schizophrenia
Films based on American novels
Films directed by Anthony Page
Films scored by Paul Chihara
Films set in Maryland
Films set in psychiatric hospitals
Films with screenplays by Lewis John Carlino
New World Pictures films
Psychotherapy in fiction
Films produced by Roger Corman
1970s American films
Films about disability